Notre-Dame-de-Ham, Quebec is a municipality in Centre-du-Québec, Quebec, Canada.

References

(Google Maps)

Municipalities in Quebec
Incorporated places in Centre-du-Québec